Agaricus brunneofibrillosus is a mushroom in the family Agaricaceae. The tightly-packed gills are initially cream colored before becoming pinkish, lilac-gray, and finally brownish as the spores mature. The stout stem is enlarged to bulbous at the base which has one or more brown bands, and a white, membranous ring. The mushroom is edible, and has a pleasant odor similar to button mushrooms, and tastes similar to Agaricus bisporus when cooked.

Systematics

This species was first studied by Rick Kerrigan, who studied collections from the California coast, and identified the collections as belonging to Agaricus fuscofibrillosus (F.H. Møller) Pilát, a species originally described from northern and central Europe. Later investigation by Kerrigan revealed that the California population was a different species from the European one, and in fact, belonged to a different subsection of Agaricus entirely. In 2016, as part of a larger monograph on the Agaricus species of North America, Kerrigan described Agaricus brunneofibrillosus as a separate species. The epithet brunneofibrillosus refers to the brown color and fibrillose texture of the pileus, as well as the distinction from A. fuscofibrillosus.

European Agaricus fuscofibrillosus is now treated as a synonym for Agaricus langei.

Description
The cap surface is dry, smooth, reddish-brown to coco-brown with silky fibrils or sometimes with flattened scales and often has a slight umbo. In maturity, the fibrils usually darken to walnut brown. The flesh is light brown and does not change color in KOH. When bruised or injured, the flesh turns bright red within 30 seconds, and later fades to brown. The odor of crushed flesh is mild and mushroomy.

The gills are initially cream colored to pale pinkish or pinkish-gray before becoming brown, then dark chocolate-brown when the spores mature. In maturity, the gills are free from attachment to the stem, packed close together, with little intervening space between them. Firm, smooth, and lacking the scales found on the cap, the stem is colored white or discolors bright red or dingy brownish in age or after handling. The partial veil is membranous, white, and forms a thin skirt-like ring on the upper portion of the stem.

Spore prints are dark chocolate brown. The smooth, thick-walled spores are elliptical, and typically measure 5–6.5 by 3.5-4 μm.  Cystidia on the gill edge (cheilocystidia) are scattered, club-shaped to cylindric and have dimensions of up to 22 by 7 μm.

Similar species
Agaricus amicosus is similar to and a close relative of A. brunneofibrillosus. It differs considerably in geography, however, being endemic to spruce and fir forests of the Rocky Mountains, though like A. brunneofibrillosus, it shows a clear preference for growth on deep leaf litter.

Agaricus pattersoniae closely resembles A. fuscofibrillosus but is larger and the cap has appressed brown squamules and is not fibrillose.  A. brunneofibrillosus is also similar to  A. fuscovelatus, but that species has a more conical cap with brownish scales, and a dark brown ring.

Habitat and distribution

Fruit bodies appear in the late fall and winter, where they grow scattered or in groups in deep leaf litter under Monterey cypresses or rarely under other trees. The mushroom is found in coastal California and is most common in the Monterey and San Francisco Bay Areas.

See also

 List of Agaricus species

References

External links

Agaricus brunneofibrillosus at mushroomobserver.org
Agaricus brunneofibrillosus at Mykoweb
Agaricus fuscofibrillosus at mushroomexpert.com

brunneofibrillosus
Fungi of North America
Edible fungi
Fungi described in 2016